Hillswick is a small village in Northmavine, on the shore of the Atlantic Ocean and lies to the north-north west of Mainland, Shetland, the most northerly group of islands in the United Kingdom. There is a community shop, a blacksmith, a public hall, a health centre, and a Church of Scotland kirk that is now mainly used for funerals, weddings and christenings. There is a wildlife sanctuary, situated at the historic former Hanseatic trading booth on the seafront, a small private art gallery with occasional public exhibitions, and the St Magnus Bay Hotel which offers accommodation, bar and restaurant services. A large dairy and sheep farm takes up the spectacular peninsula called Hillswick Ness, but there is public access and a signed walking route. There is a modern primary school at nearby Urafirth.
A small automatic lighthouse is located 1.5 miles south of Hillswick, at the tip of the Ness.

See also
 List of lighthouses in Scotland
 List of Northern Lighthouse Board lighthouses

References

External links
 Northern Lighthouse Board 
 Canmore - Hillswick, Northmavine Parish Church and Churchyard site record

Villages in Mainland, Shetland
Northmavine